Joanna Maxwell Cannan (27 May 1896 – 22 April 1961) was an English writer of pony books and detective novels, the former aimed mainly at children. She belonged to a family of prolific writers.

Life
Herself the youngest daughter of Charles Cannan, the Dean of Trinity College, Oxford, and secretary to the Delegates of Oxford University Press, and Mary Wedderburn, also a cousin of Gilbert Cannan, it is perhaps for her children that Joanna Cannan is best known. She was mother to Josephine, Diana and Christine Pullein-Thompson and Denis Cannan. She was one of three daughters. One sister was the poet May Cannan. She was also grandmother to Charlotte Popescu.

Joanna Cannan was born and brought up in Oxford, but had a fondness for Scotland, which was the destination for many family holidays and part of her maternal heritage. Her ancestors participated in some of the seminal events in Scottish history, such as the Jacobite rising and Battle of Culloden. The wilds of Roshven in the West Highlands must have seen a dramatic and romantic location in comparison to sedate Oxford, especially as the Cannan children were apparently "provided with an unrelenting diet of boys' adventure stories."

During World War 1 she became a VAD nurse, as did her Oxford friend Carola Oman, who was to become a children's author and biographer. Georgette Heyer was another friend there. It was during Cannan's nursing duties in Oxford that she met her future husband, Captain Harold J "Cappy" Pullein-Thompson, whom she married in 1918.

On her marriage she became Joanna Cannan Pullein-Thompson, but she continued to publish as Joanna Cannan. Her husband had been badly injured during the war and she was the main earner in the family, producing a book every year until she died. After their marriage, the couple moved to Wimbledon. Disapproving of traditional education, she encouraged her daughters to write and to be self-reliant. However she did impose a variety of strict house rules including, "Don't talk horses at meals." This was hard for her daughters to keep.

Cannan was diagnosed with tuberculosis in 1951. She died of heart failure in 1961 at the Blandford Cottage Hospital at Blandford Forum in Dorset. She is buried at Fairmile cemetery, Henley-on-Thames.

Books
Most of Cannan's pony books were published before or during World War II. After the war she began to experiment with detective novels, because she felt that the world she had used to write about was beginning to disappear. In the early 1950s her health began to decline: she was eventually diagnosed with tuberculosis. She died in 1961, four years after her husband.

A painting and some photographs of Joanna Cannan belong to the National Portrait Gallery in London.

As well as the books listed, she also contributed to magazines during her lifetime.

Bibliography

Pony novels for children

References
Citations

Bibliography
London Pride, Introduction by Josephine Pullein-Thompson, Edinburgh: Fidra Books, 2007
British Library
Rue Morgue Press

External links
A useful article about collecting old pony books, featuring her works and those of her daughters
Fidra Books page about Joanna Cannan
An article devoted to the author, including book scans
Author's page at Persephone Books
Persphone's page about her book Princes In The Land; also contains more information about the author
Jenny Kendrick: Riders, Readers, Romance: A Short History of the Pony Story

English children's writers
British women children's writers
English mystery writers
Pony books
20th-century English novelists
1896 births
1961 deaths
20th-century English women writers
Women mystery writers
Writers from Oxford